Giuseppe Saverio Raffaele Mercadante (baptised 17 September 179517 December 1870) was an Italian composer, particularly of operas. While Mercadante may not have retained the international celebrity of Gaetano Donizetti or Gioachino Rossini beyond his own lifetime, he composed as prolific a number of works as either; and his development of operatic structures, melodic styles and orchestration contributed significantly to the foundations upon which Giuseppe Verdi built his dramatic technique.

Biography

Early years
Mercadante was born illegitimate in Altamura, near Bari in Apulia; his precise date of birth has not been recorded, but he was baptised on 17 September 1795. Mercadante studied flute, violin and composition at the conservatory in Naples, and organized concerts among his compatriots. The opera composer Gioachino Rossini said to the conservatory Director, Niccolo Zingarelli, "My compliments, Maestro – your young pupil Mercadante begins where we finish". In 1817 he was made conductor of the college orchestra, composing a number of symphonies, and concertos for various instruments – including six for flute about 1818–1819, and whose autograph scores are in the Naples conservatory, where they were presumably first performed with him as soloist.

The encouragement of Rossini led him to compose for the opera, where he won considerable success with his second such work (Violenza e Constanza), in 1820. His next three operas are more or less forgotten, but an abridged recording of Maria Stuarda, Regina di Scozia was issued by Opera Rara in 2006. His next opera Elisa e Claudio was a huge success, and had occasional revivals in the 20th century, most recently by Wexford Festival Opera in 1988.

He worked for a time in Vienna, in Madrid, in Cádiz, and in Lisbon, but re-established himself in Italy in 1831. He was invited by Rossini to Paris in 1836, where he composed I Briganti for four of the best-known singers of the time, Giulia Grisi, Giovanni Battista Rubini, Antonio Tamburini and Luigi Lablache, all of whom worked closely with Bellini. While there, he had the opportunity to hear operas by Meyerbeer and Halévy, which imparted a strong influence on him, especially the latter's La Juive. This influence took the form of greater stress on the dramatic side.

Return to Italy, 1831
When Mercadante returned to Italy after living in Spain and Portugal, Donizetti's music reigned supreme in Naples, an ascendancy which did not end until censorship problems with the latter's Poliuto caused a final break. But Mercadante's style began to shift with the presentation of I Normanni a Parigi at the Teatro Regio in Turin in 1832: "It was with this score that Mercadante entered on the process of development in his musical dramaturgy which, in some aspects, actually presaged the arrival of Verdi, when he launched, from 1837 on, into master works of his artistic maturity: the so-called "reform operas".

The beginnings of the so-called "reform movement", of which Mercadante was part, arose from the publication of a manifesto by Giuseppe Mazzini which he wrote in 1836, the Filosofia della musica.

In the period after 1831 he composed some of his most important works. These included Il giuramento which was premiered at La Scala to 11 march 1837. One striking and innovative characteristic of this opera has been noted:
..it marks the first successful attempt in an Italian opera premiered in Italy of depriving the prima donna, or some other star singer, of her until-then inalienable right of having the stage to herself at the end. By doing this, Mercadante sounded what was to be the death knell of the age of bel canto.

Early in following year, while composing Elena da Feltre (which premiered in January 1839), Mercadante wrote to Francesco Florimo, laying out his ideas about how opera should be structured, following the "revolution" begun in his previous opera:
I have continued the revolution I began in Il giuramento: varied forms, cabalettas banished, crescendos out, vocal lines simplified, fewer repeats, more originality in the cadences, proper regard paid to the drama, orchestration rich but not so as to swamp the voices, no long solos in the ensembles (they only force the other parts to stand idle to the detriment of the action), not much bass drum, and a lot less brass band.

Elena da Feltre followed; one critic found much to praise in it:

These temporarily put him in the forefront of composers then active in Italy, although he was soon passed by Giovanni Pacini with Saffo and Giuseppe Verdi with several operas, especially Ernani.

Later works

Some of Mercadante's later works, especially Orazi e Curiazi, were also quite successful. Many performances of his operas were given throughout the 19th century and it has been noted that some of them received far more than those of Verdi's early operas over the same period of time.

Throughout his life he generated more instrumental works than most of his contemporary composers of operas due to his lifelong preoccupation with orchestration, and, from 1840, his position as the Director of the Naples conservatory for the last thirty years of his life. From 1863 he was almost totally blind and dictated all his compositions.

In the decades after his death in Naples in 1870, his output was largely forgotten, but it has been occasionally revived and recorded since World War II, although it has yet to achieve anything like the present-day popularity of the most famous compositions by his slightly younger contemporaries: see Donizetti's compositions and Bellini's compositions.

The French soloist Jean-Pierre Rampal notably recorded several Mercadante concertos for flute and string orchestra, including the grand and romantic E minor concerto, which has since gained some popularity among concert flautists.

Operas

References
Notes

Sources

Further reading
Bryan, Karen M. (1988), "Mercadante's Experiment in Form: The cabalettas of Elena da Feltre", Donizetti Society Journal Number 6, London.
De Napoli, Giuseppe, (1952) La triade melodrammatica altamurana: Giacomo Tritto, Vincenzo Lavigna, Saverio Mercadante, Milan.
Kaufman, Thomas G. (1993), "Mercadante", in the International Dictionary of Opera, vol. 2 pp. 858–861
Kaufman, Thomas G. (1996), "Catalogue of the Operas of Mercadante – Chronology of Performances with Casts", Bollettino dell Associazione Civica "Saverio Mercadante" N. 1; Altamura
Gianturco, Elio, "Review of Saverio Mercadante; nella gloria e nella luce", in Notes, Music Library Association, Second Series, Vol. 7, No. 4 (September 1950), pp. 564–565. (Accessible by subscription)
Notarnicola, Biagio (1948–49), Saverio Mercadante; nella gloria e nella luce, Rome: Diplomatica
Notarnicola, Biagio (1955), Verdi non ha vinto Mercadante, Rome
Palermo, Santo (1985), Saverio Mercadante: biografia, epistolario, Fasano
Petrucci, Gianluca and Giacinto Moramarco (1992), Saggi su Saverio Mercadante, Cassano Murge
Petrucci, Gianluca (1995), Saverio Mercadante l'ultimo dei cinque re, Rome
Summa, Matteo (1985), Bravo Mercadante, Fasano
Rose, Michael (1998), "Mercadante, Saverio", in Stanley Sadie, (Ed.), The New Grove Dictionary of Opera, Vol. Three, pp. 334 – 339. London: Macmillan.  
Walker, Frank, "Mercadante and Verdi", Music & Letters, Vol. 33, No. 4 (October 1952), pp. 311–321 (Accessible by subscription)
Wittmann, Michael (1998), "Meyerbeer und Mercadante? Überlegungen zur italienischen Meyerbeer-Rezeption." In: Sieghart Döhring, Arnold Jacobshagen (eds), Meyerbeer und das europäische Musiktheater, Laaber 1998, pp. 352–385.
Wittmann, Michael (2001), "Mercadante", in Musik in Geschichte und Gegenwart 12, with coprehensive list of works.
Wittmann, Michael (2014), "Die Wiederentdeckung Saverio Mercadantes auf der Opernbühne. Anmerkungen zur Uraufführung von Francesca da Rimini." In: Sieghart Döhring, Stefanie Rauch (eds): Musiktheater im Fokus. Zum Gedenken an Gudrun und Heinz Becker, .
Wittmann, Michael (2020),  Saverio Mercadante – Systematisches Verzeichnis seiner Werke, MW-Musikverlag, Berlin 2020: https://mwmusikverlag.wordpress.com/category/mwv-mercadante-werk-verzeichnis/.pdf

External links

 (rather outdated)

Saverio Mercadante on enjoyaltamura.com 

1795 births
1870 deaths
19th-century classical composers
19th-century Italian male musicians
Italian ballet composers
Italian classical composers
Italian male classical composers
Italian opera composers
Italian Romantic composers
Male opera composers
People from Altamura